Cesare Baronio (as an author also known as Caesar Baronius; 30 August 1538 – 30 June 1607) was an Italian cardinal and historian of the Catholic Church. His best-known works are his Annales Ecclesiastici ("Ecclesiastical Annals"), which appeared in 12 folio volumes (1588–1607). Pope Benedict XIV conferred upon him the title of Venerable.

Life 
Cesare Baronio was born at Sora in Italy in 1538, the only child of Camillo Baronio and his wife Porzia Febonia.

Baronio was educated at Veroli and Naples, where he commenced his law studies in October 1556. At Rome, he obtained his doctorate in canon law and civil law. After this, he became a member of the Congregation of the Oratory in 1557 under Philip Neri, a future saint, and was ordained to the subdiaconate on 21 December 1560 and to the diaconate on 20 May 1561. Ordination to the priesthood followed in 1564. He succeeded Philip Neri as superior of the Roman Oratory in 1593.

Pope Clement VIII, whose confessor he was from 1594, made him a cardinale on 5 June 1596 and also appointed him to head the Vatican Library.

Baronio restored this titular church and in 1597 a procession was held to transfer there a number of relics. He also had work done on the Church of San Gregorio Magno al Celio.

At subsequent conclaves, Baronio was twice considered to be papabile – the conclaves which in the event elected Pope Leo XI and Pope Paul V. On each occasion, Baronio was opposed by Spain on account of his work "On the Monarchy of Sicily", in which he supported the papal claims against those of the Spanish government.

Baronio died at Santa Maria in Vallicella in Rome on 30 June 1607, and was buried in that same church.

Works
Baronio is best known for his Annales Ecclesiastici. It was after almost three decades of lecturing Santa Maria in Vallicella that he was asked by Philip Neri to tackle this work, as an answer to a polemical anti-Catholic historical work, the Magdeburg Centuries.

In the Annales, he treats history in strict chronological order and keeps theology in the background. Lord Acton called it "the greatest history of the Church ever written". In the Annales, Baronio coined the term "Dark Age" in the Latin form saeculum obscurum, to refer to the period between the end of the Carolingian Empire in 888 and the first inklings of the Gregorian Reform under Pope Clement II in 1046.

Notwithstanding its errors, especially in Greek history where he was obliged to depend upon secondhand information, Baronio's work stands as an honest attempt at historiography. Sarpi, in urging Casaubon to write a refutation of the Annales, warned him never to accuse or suspect Baronio of bad faith.

Baronio also undertook a new edition of the Roman Martyrology (1586), in the course of his work he applied critical considerations to removed entries he considered implausible for historical reasons, and added or corrected others according to what he found in the sources to which he had access. He is also known for saying, in the context of the controversies about the work of Copernicus and Galileo, "The Bible teaches us how to go to heaven, not how the heavens go." This remark, which Baronio probably made in conversation with Galileo, was cited by the latter in his Letter to the Grand Duchess Christina (1615).

At the time of the Venetian Interdict, Baronio published a pamphlet "Paraenesis ad rempublicam Venetam" (1606). It took a stringent papalist line on the crisis. It was answered  in the same year by the Antiparaenesis ad Caesarem Baronium of Niccolò Crasso.

Biographies
A Latin biography of Baronio by the oratorian Hieronymus Barnabeus (Girolamo Barnabeo or Barnabò) appeared in 1651 as Vita Caesaris Baronii. Another Oratorian, Raymundus Albericus (Raimondo Alberici), edited three volumes of Baronio's correspondence from 1759. There are other biographies by Amabel Kerr (1898),
(republished as Cesar Cardinal Baronius: Founder of Church History, Lulu, 2015) and by Generoso Calenzio (La vita e gli scritti del cardinale Cesare Baronio, Rome 1907). The works of Mario Borrelli also contributed to the biographia of Baronius.

Beatification
Baronio left a reputation for sanctity, which led Pope Benedict XIV to approve the introductions of his cause for canonization, which led to Baronio's being proclaimed "Venerable" (12 January 1745).

In 2007, on the 400th anniversary of his death, a petition was presented  by the Procurator General of the Oratory of St Philip Neri. to reopen the cause for his canonization, which had been stalled since 1745.

References

Citations

Sources 

 Angelo Giuseppe Roncalli. "Il cardinale Cesare Baronio. Nel terzo centenario della sua morte," in La Scuola Cattolica (Monza), XXXVI, 1908, no. 12, pp. 1–29. (Reprinted with preface and notes by Giuseppe De Luca, Edizioni di Storia e Letteratura, Roma, 1961)  Roncalli's episcopal motto 'Obedientia et Pax' was taken from Baronio. [Peter Hebblethwaite JOHN XXIII: POPE OF THE CENTURY 2005 edition, p. 57.]

External links 
 

1538 births
1607 deaths
Historians of the Catholic Church
16th-century Italian cardinals
Oratorians
People from Sora, Lazio
Venerated Catholics
17th-century Italian historians
17th-century Italian cardinals
16th-century male writers
17th-century male writers
16th-century venerated Christians
17th-century Latin-language writers
16th-century Italian historians